Neil Armstrong (1930–2012) was an American astronaut and the first person to walk on the Moon.

Neil Armstrong may also refer to:
 RV Neil Armstrong (AGOR-27), a class of oceanographic research ship
 Neil J. Armstrong (1920–1994), Canadian aviator
 Neill Armstrong (1926–2016), American football player and coach
 Neil Armstrong (ice hockey)  (1932–2020), Canadian hockey player
 Neil Armstrong, writer from Adam's Family Tree

Armstrong, Neil